Charlie Capozzoli (19 June 1931 – 22 January 2013) was an American long-distance runner who competed in the 1952 Summer Olympics.

References

1931 births
2013 deaths
American male long-distance runners
Olympic track and field athletes of the United States
Athletes (track and field) at the 1952 Summer Olympics
20th-century American people